The basketball tournament at the 1959 Mediterranean Games was held in Beirut, Lebanon.

Medalists

References
1959 Competition Medalists

Basketball
Basketball at the Mediterranean Games
International basketball competitions hosted by Lebanon
1959–60 in European basketball
1959 in Asian basketball
1959 in African basketball